Kynšperk nad Ohří is a town in Sokolov District in the Karlovy Vary Region of the Czech Republic. It has about 4,600 inhabitants.

Administrative parts
Villages of Chotíkov, Dolní Pochlovice, Dvorečky, Kamenný Dvůr, Liboc, Štědrá and Zlatá are administrative parts of Kynšperk nad Ohří.

Geography
It is situated mostly in the Cheb Basin.

Kynšperk nad Ohří lies on the Ohře River. North of the town is located Boží požehnání Lake, an artificial lake created during the revitalization of a former lignite mine.

History
The town was founded in 1232. The town's founding charter is the oldest preserved document of establishing a locality in the Czech Republic and is stored in the National Archives in Prague.

Demographics

Transport
The D6 motorway runs next to the town.

Sights
The Church of the Assumption of the Virgin Mary is the landmark of the town square. It was built in the Baroque style in 1721–1727 and belongs to the most significant Baroque monuments in the region.

Notable people
Caspar Buberl (1834–1899), American sculptor
Alfred Scharf (1900–1965), British art historian

Twin towns – sister cities

Kynšperk nad Ohří is twinned with:
 Himmelkron, Germany

References

External links

Cities and towns in the Czech Republic
Populated places in Sokolov District